The 2009 African U-17 Championship was a football competition organized by the Confederation of African Football (CAF). The tournament took place in Algeria. The top four teams qualified for the 2009 FIFA U-17 World Cup. Nigeria, automatically qualified as the hosts, didn't qualify for the Finals, although if they qualified for the Finals and went on to reach the semi-finals, then the teams who finished third in their respective groups would have met in a playoff for the fourth and final place in the 2009 FIFA U-17 World Cup.

Qualification

Qualified teams 
  (host nation)

Squads

Venues

Group stage

Group A

Group B 
After the group ended, Niger was ejected from the competition for fielding an over-aged player. Their results were expunged from the standings.

Original group standings

Corrected standings

Knock-out stage

Semifinals

Third place match

Final

Winners

References

External links 
 Confederation of African Football
 African U-17 Championship 2009

 
2009
African U-17 Championship
Under
2009 in youth association football